The Mongolian Second League is the third tier competition of the football league system in Mongolia. The league was contested for the first time in 2019 and is controlled by the Mongolian Football Federation.

Stadium
Previously all Second League matches were played at the MFF Football Centre. Beginning with the 2022 season, most matches are now played at the Khan-Uul Stadium.

List of winners
2019: BCH Lions
2020: No season because of COVID-19 pandemic
2021: Ilch FC
2021/22: FC Bavarians
2022/23:

References

Football competitions in Mongolia
Third level football leagues in Asia
2019 establishments in Mongolia